Paralympic biathlon is an adaptation of biathlon for athletes with a disability. Paralympic biathlon is one of two Nordic skiing disciplines in the Winter Paralympic Games. It is governed by the International Paralympic Committee.

Paralympic biathlon includes standing events, sitting events (for wheelchair users), and events for visually impaired athletes.

Visually impaired athletes use a rifle that uses sound to indicate to the athlete how accurate their aim is, and shoots a laser beam at the target.

References

External links
IPC Nordic Skiing

 
Biathlon
Biathlon